Events from the year 1821 in France.

Incumbents
 Monarch – Louis XVIII
 Prime Minister – Armand-Emmanuel de Vignerot du Plessis, Duc de Richelieu (until 14 December), then Joseph de Villèle

Events
5 May - Napoléon dies in exile at Saint Helena. The cause of his death is still disputed.

Births
11 February - Auguste Mariette, scholar and archaeologist (died 1881)
9 April - Charles Baudelaire, poet, critic and translator (died 1867)
6 June - Jean-André Cuoq, philologist (died 1898)
1 July - Anatole Jean-Baptiste Antoine de Barthélemy, archaeologist and numismatist (died 1904)
18 July - Pauline García-Viardot, mezzo-soprano and composer (died 1910)
29 August - Louis Laurent Gabriel de Mortillet, anthropologist (died 1898)
17 September - Léonard-Léopold Forgemol de Bostquénard, general (died 1897)
22 November - Charles Brun, naval engineer (died 1897)
12 December - Gustave Flaubert, novelist (died 1880)
December - Joseph Déjacque, anarcho-communist poet and writer (died 1864)
Undated - Michel Lévy, publisher (died 1875)

Deaths
15 March - Guy-Toussaint-Julien Carron, Roman Catholic priest and writer (born 1760)
17 March - Louis-Marcelin de Fontanes, poet and politician (born 1757)
5 May - Napoleon I of France, military and political leader (born 1769)
19 May
François-Henri de Franquetot de Coigny, Marshal of France (born 1737)
Camille Jordan, politician (born 1771)
21 June - César Guillaume de La Luzerne, Cardinal (born 1738)
19 August - Marie-Denise Villers, painter (born 1774)
18 September - Jean-Nicolas Corvisart, physician (born 1755)
8 November - Jean Rapp, general lieutenant (born 1771)
Undated - Jules Granier, composer (born 1770)

References

1820s in France